Tibetan Freedom Concert was a series of rock concerts between 1996 and 2001 to support the cause of Tibetan independence. This album covers the 1997 concert held in New York City. The album was recorded and produced by Pat McCarthy and Sylvia Massy, and mixed in New York City at Greene Street Studios.

Track listing

Disc 1
Opening prayers – Tibetan monks
"Ground On Down" – Ben Harper
"Blues Explosion Man" – The Jon Spencer Blues Explosion
"Om Mani Padme Hung" – Yungchen Lhamo
"About a Boy" – Patti Smith
"Fake Plastic Trees" – Radiohead
"Oh My God" – A Tribe Called Quest
"One" – U2
"Cast No Shadow" – Noel Gallagher
"Wildflower" – Sonic Youth
"Meija" – Porno for Pyros
"The Celebration" – Nawang Khechog
"This Is a Call" – Foo Fighters
"The Bridge Is Over/Black Cop/South Bronx Medley" – KRS-One
"Star Spangled Banner/Nobody Beats the Biz" – Biz Markie
Closing prayers – Tibetan monks

Disc 2
Opening prayers – Tibetan monks
"Yellow Ledbetter" – Eddie Vedder & Mike McCready
"Noise Brigade" – The Mighty Mighty Bosstones
"Type Slowly" – Pavement
"Gyi Ma Gyi" – Dadon
"Heads of Government" – Lee "Scratch" Perry
"She Caught the Katy" – Taj Mahal & The Phantom Blues Band
"Beetlebum" – Blur
"Electrolite" – Mike Mills and Michael Stipe
"Ajo Sotop" – Chaksam-pa
"Wake Up" – Alanis Morissette
"Hyper-Ballad" – Björk
"The Harder They Come" – Rancid
"Root Down" – Beastie Boys
"Closing prayers" – Tibetan monks

Disc 3
"Birthday Cake" – Cibo Matto
"Asshole" – Beck
"Me, Myself & I" – De La Soul
"Fu-Gee-La" – The Fugees
"Bulls on Parade" – Rage Against the Machine

References

Collaborative albums
Charity albums
1997 live albums
1997 compilation albums
Capitol Records compilation albums
Capitol Records live albums
Politics of Tibet